Tomislav Erceg (born 22 October 1971) is a Croatian former professional footballer who played as a forward. He made four appearances for the Croatia national team, scoring one goal.

Club career
Erceg started his career at HNK Šibenik in 1990, moving to HNK Hajduk Split after his first season with the club. After three seasons in Split, he went abroad, going on to play in the national leagues of Switzerland, Germany, Italy, Spain, Turkey, Japan and Israel. He was top scorer of the Prva HNL when he played for NK Rijeka in the 2004–05 season, scoring 17 goals. He was Rijeka's first player to become the league goalscorer in Prva HNL

As of May 2010 and the conclusion of the 2009–10 Prva HNL season, Erceg is ranked fifth all-time top scorer in Prva HNL with 97 goals.

International career
He made his debut for Croatia in a June 1997 Kirin Cup match against Japan, coming on as a 74th-minute substitute for Robert Prosinečki, and earned a total of 4 caps, scoring 1 goal in a friendly game against Turkey on 12 June 1997. His final international was a September 1997 1998 FIFA World Cup qualification World Cup qualification match away against Denmark.

Career statistics

Club
Source:

International

International goals

Honours
Hajduk Split
Croatian First League: 1992, 1993–94, 1994–95
Croatian Cup: 1993, 1995
Croatian Super Cup: 1992, 1993, 1994, 2003

Rijeka
Croatian Cup: 2005

Individual
Croatian Cup top scorer: 1994–95, 2004–05
Prva HNL Player of the Year (Tportal): 2004
Croatian First League top scorer: 2004–05
Fifth all-time top goalscorer of Croatian First League

References

External links
 
 
 
 

1971 births
Living people
Footballers from Split, Croatia
Association football forwards
Yugoslav footballers
Croatian footballers
Croatia international footballers
HNK Šibenik players
HNK Hajduk Split players
Grasshopper Club Zürich players
FC Lugano players
MSV Duisburg players
A.C. Ancona players
A.C. Perugia Calcio players
Levante UD footballers
Kocaelispor footballers
Sanfrecce Hiroshima players
Hapoel Petah Tikva F.C. players
HNK Rijeka players
SpVgg Greuther Fürth players
Yugoslav Second League players
Croatian Football League players
Swiss Super League players
Bundesliga players
Serie B players
Serie A players
Segunda División players
TFF First League players
Süper Lig players
J1 League players
J2 League players
Israeli Premier League players
2. Bundesliga players
Croatian expatriate footballers
Expatriate footballers in Switzerland
Croatian expatriate sportspeople in Switzerland
Expatriate footballers in Germany
Croatian expatriate sportspeople in Germany
Expatriate footballers in Italy
Croatian expatriate sportspeople in Italy
Expatriate footballers in Spain
Croatian expatriate sportspeople in Spain
Expatriate footballers in Turkey
Croatian expatriate sportspeople in Turkey
Expatriate footballers in Japan
Croatian expatriate sportspeople in Japan
Expatriate footballers in Israel
Croatian expatriate sportspeople in Israel